The Azad University, Astara Branch (Dāneŝgāhe Āzāde Āstārā) is a branch of the Free University of Astara that was started in 1987. It is in Astara, city, Gilan Province, Iran.

References

Astara
Educational institutions established in 1987
Education in Gilan Province
Buildings and structures in Gilan Province
1987 establishments in Iran